Aogram is a village located in the Mongolkote sub district in Purba Bardhaman, West Bengal. It is located at a distance of 15 km from Guskhara and encompasses a total of 151.99 hectares. It is home to 182 households having a total populations of 702 individuals as of 2009.

References 

Villages in Purba Bardhaman district